City Evangelical Church is an independent evangelical church in Beeston, Leeds, West Yorkshire, England. It is situated on Cemetery Road in the former Beeston Hill Baptist Chapel.

The church is affiliated to the Fellowship of Independent Evangelical Churches.

History
The church was formed in 1957 under the name Cottingley Free Church. In recent years, the church has grown and has helped to replant Batley Evangelical Church and also started a new church plant in Roundhay, north Leeds.

Location
The church is located in Beeston, quite near to Elland Road football stadium and the M621 motorway.

Services
The main church services are held on Sundays at 10.45am and 6.30pm.

References

External links
Church website
CityLife: news and updates from City
City on Twitter
Beliefs

Churches in Leeds
Fellowship of Independent Evangelical Churches
Christian organizations established in 1957
20th-century Protestant churches
Evangelical organizations established in the 20th century